Yas Tappeh (also Romanized as Yās Tappeh; also known as Yāz Tappeh and Yāz-Toppeh) is a village in Sarakhs Rural District, in the Central District of Sarakhs County, Razavi Khorasan Province, Iran. At the 2006 census, its population was 2,189, in 471 families.

References 

Populated places in Sarakhs County